Kittyhawk is an American emo band from Chicago, Illinois. The band has currently released one full-length album, one extended play, and four splits. The band broke up in 2016, but announced they were reunited and back in action in October 2019.

History
Kittyhawk began in 2011. The following year it released its debut self-titled EP via Skeletal Lightning, and Storm Chaser Records, a record label owned by Evan Weiss (Into It. Over It.). 

In 2013, the band released a 7" split EP with Cherry Cola Champions via Flannel Gurl Records. 

In early 2014, the band released a split with Prawn, Droughts, and Frameworks. Later in 2014, the band was featured on a four way split from The Fest titled Sundae Bloody Sundae with The World Is a Beautiful Place & I Am No Longer Afraid to Die, Two Knights and Rozwell Kid via Skeletal Lightning. 

In October 2014, Kittyhawk released their debut full-length album titled Hello, Again via Count Your Lucky Stars.

In late 2014, the band was featured on a split by Soft Speak Records with You Blew It!, Dikembe, and Have Mercy.

Band members
Kate Grube - Vocals / Keyboard
Mark Jaeschke - Guitar / Vocals
Erik Czaja - Guitar / Vocals
Evan Loritsch - Drums / Vocals
Clare Teeling - Bass / Vocals

References

Musical groups from Chicago
Musical groups established in 2011
2011 establishments in Illinois
Count Your Lucky Stars Records artists